"Wit licht" (English: "White Light") is a single by Dutch singer-songwriter Marco Borsato, from his album "Wit licht". The song was released on April 18, 2008. It was written and produced by John Ewbank. It reached the peak position in both the Mega Single Top 100 and the Dutch Top 40. In Flanders, the song reached the third position in the Ultratop 50.

On March 20, 2008, it was announced that an eponymous album and an eponymous movie, with Borsato in one of the leading roles, would be released. The album Wit licht was released on September 17 and reached the peak position in both the Album Top 100 in the Netherlands and the Ultratop 100 Albums in Flanders. The movie Wit licht, directed by Jean van de Velde, premiered on December 8 in the Tuschinski movie theater in Amsterdam. Prince Willem-Alexander and princess Máxima visited the première.

Charts

Weekly charts

Year-end charts

See also

List of Dutch Top 40 number-one singles of 2006

References

Marco Borsato songs
2008 singles
Dutch Top 40 number-one singles
Universal Music Group singles
2008 songs
Songs written by John Ewbank (composer)